Morten Ågnes Konradsen (born 3 May 1996) is a Norwegian professional footballer who plays as a midfielder for Norwegian Premier League side Bodø/Glimt.

Career 
Konradsen is a younger brother of fellow footballer Anders Ågnes Konradsen. He made his senior debut for Bodø/Glimt in the first round of the 2012 Norwegian Football Cup, and scored a goal. He played eleven games in the 2013 Norwegian First Division, and made his first-tier debut in April 2014 against Sogndal.

In August 2017, Morten joined Rosenborg, which meant he teamed up with his brother Anders Konradsen. In 2018 Konradsen returned to Bodø/Glimt.

Career statistics

Club

Honours 
Rosenborg
Eliteserien: 2017
Mesterfinalen: 2018

Bodø/Glimt
Eliteserien:  2020, 2021

References 

1996 births
Living people
Sportspeople from Bodø
Norwegian footballers
Association football midfielders
Eliteserien players
Norwegian First Division players
FK Bodø/Glimt players
Rosenborg BK players